Endocrine Practice is a bimonthly peer-reviewed medical journal covering endocrinology. It was established in 1995, and is the official journal of the American Association of Clinical Endocrinologists (AACE) and the American College of Endocrinology (ACE). It is published by AACECOR, Inc., a subsidiary of the AACE and ACE, and the editor-in-chief is Derek LeRoith (Icahn School of Medicine at Mount Sinai). According to the Journal Citation Reports, the journal has a 2017 impact factor of 3.805.

References

External links

Endocrinology journals
Publications established in 1995
Bimonthly journals
Academic journals published by learned and professional societies of the United States
English-language journals